Besh-Tash Nature Park is a nature park in Talas Region, Kyrgyzstan. It is located 13 km from the city of Talas. It was established in 1996. It currently covers 13,731.5 hectares, including 5,895 hectares of strictly protected area and 334.5 hectares for regulated recreational use.

Besh-Tash Nature Park is located in the Talas Valley, on the northern slopes of the central part of the Talas Alatoo mountain range. The river Besh-Tash flows through the park.

At the end of the valley is the pearl of this park, a large turquoise lake. Very rare snow leopards live in this area.

References

Protected areas established in 1996
National parks of Kyrgyzstan